Agnes Meyer may refer to:

 Agnes Meyer-Brandis (born 1973), German artist
 Agnes Meyer Driscoll (1889–1971), American cryptanalyst
 Agnes E. Meyer (1887–1970), American journalist and wife of Eugene Meyer